Valeska Soares (born in 1957 in Belo Horizonte, MG) is a Brooklyn-based Brazilian-American sculptor and installation artist.

Her sculptures and installations utilize a wide range of materials—including reflective mirrors, antique books and furniture, chiseled marble, bottles of perfume—and draw on both her training in architecture and the tools of minimalism and conceptualism.

Education and career 
Valeska Soares received a Bachelor of Architecture from the Universidade Santa Úrsula, Rio de Janeiro, in 1987. In 1990, she completed a graduate certificate in the History of Art and Architecture from the Pontifícia Universidade Católica of Rio de Janeiro.

She presented her first solo exhibition in 1991 at Rio's Espaço Cultural Sérgio Porto. That same year she was awarded a fellowship from Coordenação de Aperfeiçoamento de Pessoal de Nível Superior (CAPES) to obtain an MFA from Pratt Institute. In 1994, after completing her MFA, she became a Doctor of Arts Candidate at the New York University School of Education and had her first New York solo exhibition at the Information Gallery.

In 2003 she had her first survey exhibition, Valeska Soares: Follies, which was presented by the Bronx Museum of the Arts and traveled to the Museo de Arte Contemporâneo in Monterrey in Mexico.

Soares’ work has been included in numerous international exhibitions, including the Venice Biennale of 2011 and 2005; the São Paulo Biennial of 2009, 1998, and 1994; the Sharjah Biennial in 2009; the Taipei Biennal in 2006; the Liverpool Biennial in 2004; and the Havana Biennial in 1991.

Work 
Soares' education in architecture solidified her interest in site specificity and artworks that consider their spatial context. Her work often explores the point of transition from one physical or psychological state to another.

Soares's sculptures and installations repeatedly contrast slick, reflective materials such as stainless steel and mirrors, with more ephemeral ones, like roses and lilies, revealing her interest in matters of subjectivity, perception, reflection, and distortion. These mirrored surfaces are used as a way to engage the viewers, who transition from passive spectator to active participant. She also uses numerous other sensory techniques, like sound, and smell, to create new environments and experiences for viewers.

Recurring themes in Soares' work are interpersonal relationships, glossaries, labyrinths, and gardens, elements through which the artist alludes to mythology, literature, and to art history itself.

Public collections 

Soares work is included in the collections of museums and cultural institutions in Brazil, Spain, Switzerland, England, Mexico and USA:

Albright-Knox Art Gallery, Buffalo, NY, USA
Bronx Museum of the Arts, Bronx, NY, USA
 Burger Collection, Zürich, Switzerland
Carnegie Museum of Art, Pittsburgh, PA, USA
 Centro De Arte Contemporánea – CAC, Malaga, Spain
 Centro Galego de Arte Contemporánea – CGAC, Santiago de Compostela, Spain
 Cisneros Fontanals Art Foundation, Miami, FL, USA
Corcoran Gallery of Art, Washington, DC, USA
Dallas Museum of Art, Dallas, TX, USA
Daros Foundation, Zürich, Switzerland
Fundação Cultural ITAU, São Paulo, SP, Brazil
 Fundación “la Caixa”, Barcelona, Spain
Hirshhorn Museum and Sculpture Garden, Washington DC, USA
Inhotim – Centro de Arte Contemporânea, Brumadinho, MG, Brazil
 JP Morgan Chase, New York, NY
 Katzen American University Museum, Washington, DC, USA
 Laumeier Sculpture Park, Saint Louis, MO, USA
Los Angeles County Museum of Art, Los Angeles, CA, USA
Museo de Arte Contemporánea – MARCO, Monterrey, Mexico
Museu Arte de Pampulha – MAP, Belo Horizonte, Brazil
Museu de Arte Contemporânea – MAC, São Paulo, SP, Brazil
Museu de Arte Moderna – MAM, Rio de Janeiro, RJ, Brazil
Museu de Arte Moderna de Sao Paulo, Sao Paulo, Brazil
Museu Extremeño e Iberoamericano de Arte Contemporáneo – MEIAC, Badojoz, Spain
Museum of Contemporary Art – MOCA, San Diego, CA, USA
New Mexico Museum of Art, Santa Fe, NM
Pinacoteca Museum, Sao Paulo, Brazil
Santa Barbara Museum of Art, Santa Barbara, CA
Solomon Guggenheim Museum, New York, NY, USA
Tate Modern, London, England, UK
 The Mildred Lane Kemper Art Museum, Washington University in St. Louis, MO
 The MINT Museum of Art, Charlotte, NC, USA
The National Museum of Women in the Arts, Washington DC, USA
The Phillips Collection, Washington, DC, USA

References

External links 

 Artist Website

1957 births
Brazilian women artists
Brazilian artists
Living people
Universidade Santa Úrsula alumni
Pratt Institute alumni